İsmail Müştak Mayakon (1882–1938) was a Turkish writer, member of parliament, nationalist politician and eugenist.

References 

1882 births
1938 deaths
People from Thessaly
20th-century Turkish politicians
Turkish writers
Republican People's Party (Turkey) politicians